The Sergeant Was a Lady is a 1961 American comedy film written and directed by Bernard Glasser. The film stars Martin West, Venetia Stevenson, Bill Williams, Catherine McLeod, Roy Engel, and Gregg Martell. The film was released on October 4, 1961, by Universal Pictures.

Plot

Cast
Martin West as Cpl. Gale Willard
Venetia Stevenson as Sgt. Judy Fraser
Bill Williams as Col. House
Catherine McLeod as Maj. Hay
Roy Engel as Sgt. Bricker
Gregg Martell as Red Henning
Chickie Lind as Lenore Bliss
Jomarie Pettitt as Marge McKay
Mari Lynn as Rose Miller
Joan Barry as Rita Waters
Francine York as Tina Baird
Rhoda Williams as Lt. Witt
Doris Fesette as Lt. Read
Lonnie Blackman as Capt. Beal
Richard Emory as Maj. Zilker
James Dale as Sgt. Thomas
Dan White as Gen. Payson
Hal Torey as Col. Burns
John Mitchum as MP #1
Michael Masters as MP #2

References

Citations

Sources

External links
 

1961 films
American comedy films
1961 comedy films
Universal Pictures films
Military humor in film
1960s English-language films
1960s American films